The 1970 All-Big Eight Conference football team consists of American football players chosen by various organizations for All-Big Eight Conference teams for the 1970 NCAA University Division football season.  The selectors for the 1970 season included the Associated Press (AP).

Offensive selections

Ends
 Hermann Eben, Oklahoma State (AP)
 Otto Stowe, Iowa State (AP)

Tackles
 Larron Jackson, Missouri (AP)
 Bob Newton, Nebraska (AP)

Guards
 Dennis Havig, Colorado (AP)
 Steve Lawson, Kansas (AP)

Centers
 Don Popplewell, Colorado (AP)

Quarterbacks
 Lynn Dickey, Kansas State (AP)

Halfbacks
 Joe Wylie, Oklahoma (AP)
 Joe Orduna, Nebraska (AP)

Fullbacks
 John Riggins, Kansas (AP)

Defensive selections

Defensive ends
 Herb Orvis, Colorado (AP)
 Mike Kuhn, Kansas State (AP)

Defensive tackles
 Dave Walline, Nebraska (AP)
 Ron Yankowski, Kansas State (AP)

Middle guards
 Ed Periard, Nebraska (AP)

Linebackers
 Jerry Murtaugh, Nebraska (AP)
 Oscar Gibson, Kansas State (AP)
 Steve Aycock, Oklahoma (AP)

Defensive backs
 Clarence Scott, Kansas State (AP)
 Tony Washington, Iowa State (AP)
 Monty Johnson, Oklahoma (AP)

Key

AP = Associated Press

See also
 1970 College Football All-America Team

References

All-Big Seven Conference football team
All-Big Eight Conference football teams